Events from the year 1836 in the United States. Exceptionally, this page covers not only the history of the United States, but also that of the Republic of Texas in 1836.

Incumbents

Federal Government 
 President: Andrew Jackson (D-Tennessee)
 Vice President: Martin Van Buren (D-New York)
 Chief Justice: Roger B. Taney (Maryland)
 Speaker of the House of Representatives: James K. Polk (D-Tennessee)
 Congress: 24th

Events

January–March

 January 5 – Davy Crockett arrives in Texas, which at this time is not part of the United States.
 January 18 – Dade County, Florida, is formed.
 February 3 – United States Whig Party holds its first convention in Albany, New York.
 February 5 – Henry Roe Campbell builds the first 4-4-0, a steam locomotive type that will soon become the most common on all railroads of the United States.
 February 23 – Battle of the Alamo: The siege of the Alamo begins in San Antonio, Texas.
 February 25 – Samuel Colt receives an American patent for the Colt revolver, the first practical adaptation of the revolving flintlock pistol.
 March 1 – At the Convention of 1836, delegates from 57 Texas communities convene in Washington-on-the-Brazos to deliberate independence from Mexico.
 March 2 – At the Convention of 1836, the Republic of Texas declares independence from Mexico.
 March 6 – The Battle of the Alamo ends; 189 Texans are slaughtered by about 1,600 Mexicans.
 March 17 – Texas abolishes the slave trade.
 March 27
 Texas Revolution: Goliad massacre – Antonio López de Santa Anna orders the Mexican army to kill about 400 Texans at Goliad, Texas.
 U.S. Survey of the Coast returned to U.S. Treasury Department as the U.S. Coastal Survey.
 March 31 – Marshall College, named for John Marshall, opens in Mercersburg, Pennsylvania. It later merges with Franklin College to become Franklin and Marshall College in Lancaster, Pennsylvania.

April–June
 April 20 – U.S. Congress passes act creating the Wisconsin Territory.
 April 21 – Texas Revolution: Battle of San Jacinto – Republic of Texas forces under Sam Houston defeat troops under Mexican General Antonio López de Santa Anna. (Santa Anna and hundreds of his troops are taken prisoner along the San Jacinto River the next day.)
 April 22 – Texas Revolution: A day after the Battle of San Jacinto, forces under Texas General Sam Houston capture Mexican General Antonio López de Santa Anna.
 May 4 – The Ancient Order of Hibernians, an Irish Catholic fraternal organization, is founded in New York City.
 May 19 – Fort Parker massacre: Among those captured by Native Americans is 9-year-old Cynthia Ann Parker; she later gives birth to a son named Quanah, who becomes the last chief of the Comanche.
 June 15 – Arkansas is admitted as the 25th U.S. state (see History of Arkansas).
 June 28 – James Madison, the fourth President of the United States and United States Secretary of State, dies in Montpelier, Virginia.

July–September
 July 3 – Wisconsin Territory is effective.
 July 8 – Valparaiso, Indiana is incorporated.
 July 11 – President Andrew Jackson issues the Specie Circular, beginning the failure of the land speculation economy that will lead to the Panic of 1837.
 July 13 – U.S. patent #1 is granted after filing 9,957 unnumbered patents.
 July 30 – The first English language newspaper is published in Hawaii.
 August 1 – Abolition Riot of 1836 in the Massachusetts Supreme Judicial Court: Two fugitive slave women are freed from the courtroom by spectators.
 August 30 – The city of Houston, Texas, is founded.
 September 1 – Narcissa Whitman, one of the first white women to settle west of the Rocky Mountains, arrives at Walla Walla, Washington.
 September 5 – Sam Houston is elected as the first president of the Republic of Texas.
 September 8 – Transcendental Club founded in Cambridge, Massachusetts.

October–December

October 15 – Alexander Twilight becomes the first African American elected to public office, joining the Vermont House of Representatives.
 October 22 – Sam Houston is inaugurated as first elected President of the Republic of Texas.
 December 4 – Whig Party holds its first national convention, in Harrisburg, Pennsylvania.
 December 7 – U.S. presidential election, 1836: Martin Van Buren defeats William Henry Harrison.
 December 10 – Emory College, the forerunner of Emory University, is chartered in Oxford, Georgia.
 December 14 – The Toledo War, the mostly bloodless boundary dispute between Ohio and the adjoining Michigan Territory, is unofficially ended by a resolution passed by the controversial "Frostbitten Convention".
 December 15 – The United States Patent Office burns in Washington, D.C.
 December 20 – Sudden freeze kills many travelers in Illinois.
 December 23 – Georgia Female College, the forerunner of Wesleyan College, is chartered in Macon, Georgia as the first college for women in the U.S.

Undated
 American Temperance Union established.
 First McGuffey Readers published.
 The first printed literature in Assyrian Neo-Aramaic is produced by Justin Perkins, an American Presbyterian missionary.
 The New Board brokerage group is founded in New York City.
 James Peter Allaire's company, the Howell Works, is at its peak.
 George Catlin ends his 6-year tour of 50 tribes in the Dakota Territory.

Ongoing
 Second Seminole War (1835–1842)

Births
 January 10 – Charles Ingalls, settler father of Laura Ingalls Wilder (died 1902)
 February 5 – William E. Miller soldier and Pennsylvania State Senator (died 1919)
 February 9 – Franklin B. Gowen, industrialist (died 1889)
 February 24 – Winslow Homer, landscape painter and printmaker (died 1910)
 February 27 – Russell A. Alger, U.S. Senator from Michigan from 1902 to 1907 (died 1907)
 March 2 – John W. Foster, journalist and politician (died 1917)
 March 20 – Ferris Jacobs, Jr., politician (died 1886)
 April 27 – Charles Bendire, U.S. Army officer and ornithologist (died 1897)
 May 23 – Touch the Clouds (Maȟpíya Ičáȟtagya), Native American chieftain of Teton Lakota Sioux (died 1905)
 May 27 – Jay Gould, railroad developer and speculator (died 1892)
 June 15 – George L. Shoup, U.S. Senator from Idaho from 1890 to 1901 (died 1904)
 June 16 – Wesley Merritt, U.S. Army general (died 1910)
 June 28 – Lyman J. Gage, financier and Presidential Cabinet Officer (died 1927)
 June 29 – Thomas Philander Ryder, composer, organist, teacher, conductor and organ builder (died 1887)
 July 26 – Ellen Maria Colfax, wife of Schuyler Colfax, Second Lady of the United States (died 1911)
 August 5 – John T. Raymond, born John O'Brien, actor (died 1887)
 August 11 – Sarah Morgan Bryan Piatt, poet (died 1919)
 August 16 – John Peirce, inventor (died 1897)
 August 25 – Bret Harte, writer of fiction and poetry (died 1902)
 September 10 – Joseph Wheeler, U.S. Army general and politician (died 1906)
 September 11 – Fitz Hugh Ludlow, writer (died 1870)
 September 18 – William Jackson Palmer, railroad civil engineer, Union Army general, industrialist and philanthropist (died 1909)
 November 1 – George E. Spencer, U.S. Senator from Alabama from 1868 to 1879 (died 1893)
 November 8 – Milton Bradley, game pioneer and businessman (died 1911)
 November 11 – Thomas Bailey Aldrich, editor, poet and novelist (died 1907)
 December 19 – Maria Sanford, American educator (died 1920)

Deaths
 January 30 – Betsy Ross, flagmaker (born 1752)
 February 18 – Cornplanter (Gaiänt'wakê), Seneca chief (b. 1750)
 February 23 – Ezra Ames, portrait painter (born 1768)
 March 6 (at the Battle of the Alamo)
 James Bowie Texas revolutionary (born 1796)
 Davy Crockett, king of the wild frontier (born 1786)
 William Barret Travis, Texas revolutionary (born 1809)
 March 16 – Nathaniel Bowditch, mathematician (born 1773)
 March 27 – James Fannin, Texas Revolutionary (born 1804)
 April 29 – Simon Kenton, frontiersman and Revolutionary War militia general (born 1755)
 June 9 – Supply Belcher, composer and singer (born 1751)
 June 25 – Jesse Bledsoe, U.S. Senator from Kentucky from 1813 to 1814 (born 1776)
 June 28 – James Madison, fourth President of the United States from 1809 to 1817 (born 1751)
 September 14 – Aaron Burr, third Vice President of the United States from 1801 to 1805 (born 1756)
 October 10 – Martha Jefferson Randolph, Acting First Lady of the United States from 1801 to 1809 (born 1772)
 November – Tenskwatawa, Shawnee prophet and political leader (born 1775)
 December 27 – Stephen F. Austin, pioneer (born 1793)

See also
Timeline of United States history (1820–1859)

References

External links
 

 
1830s in the United States
United States
United States
Years of the 19th century in the United States